Río Turbio is a town and municipality in the Güer Aike Department of the Santa Cruz Province in southern Argentina.

It was founded in late 1942, as a consequence of the coal mining in the area. Rio Turbio was home to the state-owned coal extraction company YCF. The mine is currently operated by Yacimientos Carboníferos Río Turbio.

Río Turbio Airport is located near to 28 de Noviembre town, about 16 km southwest of Rio Turbio.

Climate
Under the Köppen climate classification, Río Turbio is classified as a subpolar oceanic climate (Köppen climate classification: Cfc) with cold winters. The climate is characterized by strong westerly winds, which are generated by the influence of the two semi-permanent high pressure systems in the South Atlantic and South Pacific.

References

Populated places in Santa Cruz Province, Argentina
Cities in Argentina
Argentina
Santa Cruz Province, Argentina